Now known as the Toronto Caribbean Carnival, Caribana began as a one-time celebration of the Canadian Centennial in Ontario's provincial capital city. Within the first five years, 1967 to 1971, the festival aimed to share West Indian (Black Canadian, Indo-Caribbean and Chinese-Caribbean) culture with the community at large, and to fund the creation of a permanent West Indian cultural centre.

During the era, the festival took an early shape, different from recent celebrations, growing and gaining the support of the City and Toronto's Protestant Caucasian majority. The event attracted Caribbean country leaders and top musical and stage acts to supplement the parade. In late 1968, a new festival called Carnival Toronto was proposed; receiving government funding, Caribana resisted their merger attempts, which sought to combine several existing festivals into one event. The event was largely unsuccessful, ending after one year. Four largely peaceful years were marred in 1971 by a car accident causing parade route deaths, and public transit fumbles which led to fighting.

1967

Planning and proposal
Across the country, the Canadian Centennial was celebrated by the federal, provincial, and municipal governments with an array of special projects, events, and other creations. Along with government projects, other groups started their own events to celebrate. Among the happenings on Toronto's Centre Island was a hedge maze, the newly created Centreville Amusement Park, and Caribana, a festival for the Caribbean population of 12,000 in Toronto. The Toronto Star said that the event "plans to blow the Centennial works in a whing-ding, one-week celebration designed to pale the '67 efforts of any other Metro "ethnic" community." Organized over nine months, its committee included a doctor, two lawyers, a town planner, and a teacher, all Caribbean emigrants working in Metro Toronto.

During a late 1966 meeting at a downtown Toronto firehall, it was decided that the concept of carnival was universal amongst Caribbean cultures, and Trinidad and Tobago's celebrations were the best model. The August long weekend was chosen for its heat and low chance of rain.

On February 21, 1967, Caribbean Centennial Committee executive chairman Samuel A. Cole sent a letter requesting "permission to stage an exhibition of West Indian trade and cultural achievements at Olympic Island during the period of August 5 to 12, 1967:

The Metropolitan Parks Commissioner issued a report to the Parks and Recreation Committee on March 6, recommending the approval of a "Caribbean Centennial project at Olympic Island, Toronto Island". Thompson asked that approval be granted, with all details approved by the Metropolitan Parks Commissioner, and he asked to be authorized to co-operate with the group, so long as no direct costs were incurred to Metro.

Events
The Caribbean Centennial Committee announced the "Caribana '67 Week" event on July 12. On Olympic Island event was to include the importation of coconut trees. The group sought information from the parks department "officers regarding irrigation systems and turf repair", in relation to planting tropical trees. The event would represent the 10 "main" Caribbean islands, plus Bermuda and Guyana. The event would include "a series of performances covering steel bands, calypso, dance, drama, night club and variety acts, films, water-skiing, kids' carnivals and adult carnivals." Calypso ferry cruises, teen fashion shows, a Caribbean fruit and vegetable market, Caribbean Queen contest, and the "usual" booths. A water-skiing festival was held on the island, simultaneously, on the weekend.

Byron Lee and the Dragonaires were featured at a semi-formal ball at Casa Loma, August 4. The ball would become an annual tradition for some years, rotating from location-to-location.

The parade launched the week's public events, heading from Varsity Stadium down University Avenue, to a reception at City Hall with Mayor William Dennison, and onto the docks. "As a carnival style parade, it'll be wide open to anybody who feels in the mood." Event chairman Dr. J. A. Liverpool explained to The Star that participants paid $10 or more for their costumes, which cost $30 to $40 a piece. Liverpool told that the subsidy was because "many of the paraders have jobs as maids or clerks." The Star reported with a single photograph, captioned that "a mile-long carnival procession of a thousand people in gaily-colored costumed  gyrating to the music of five calypso bands." Ten of the floats and a thousand paraders didn't leave the stadium until 11:30 am, despite a 9:30 am start time. Dr. J. Alban told the Toronto Telegram that "West Indian time is different than North American time." The first parade attracted 50,000 spectators, but given Torontonian's typical reserve, it was considered quite quiet, compared to other carnivals.

On Sunday, August 6, the concerts on the Toronto Islands attracted 32,000, "a record mob"; "statistically, Caribana '67 is the event of the year". The Trinidadian performers from Expo 67 performed hourly from 6 to 10 pm on one day, the Journard Trinidad Players performed at their top level, despite no chance to rest after their trip from Montreal. There was a rainstorm at the start of the show, and a steel band played three numbers in the dark, flawlessly, when the lights short-circuited. Thanks to popular demand, Caribana '67 was extended an additional day, to the next Sunday. That final day set a one-day record for ferry use of 35,000, upping the old record by 3,000. Governor-General of Jamaica Sir Clifford Campbell, the first Jamaican-born Governor-General of that country, made a surprise guest appearance when returning home from Expo 67.

The entire event was to cost $50,000. Only $4,000 of that was contributed in advance, the rest being "paid as they occur by scores of West Indian Canadians." The Ontario Centennial Commission contributed $1,000 in advance. Within two months before the event, the "big islands" decided to send exhibits, but none funded the event. A group of sponsors agreed to cover any debt at the end of the festival, if box office tallies failed to result in a profit. If a profit was reached, it was to go to establishing a West Indian cultural centre.

During the final Saturday and Sunday of the event, the Trinidad Theatre Workshop performed at the Central Library's theatre; founder Derek Walcott would earn a Nobel Prize in 1992. The troupe came for free, with only airfare, room, and board covered, to perform the world premiere of Walcott's play "Dream on Monkey Mountain", and two one act plays the following night, "Albee's Zoo Story" and "Walcott's Journard: A Comedy  Until the Last Minute". The group had performed in open air, as Caribana organizers had provided, but the plays were drowned out by crowd noise. The library was arranged at the last minute.

Reception

Toronto Mayor William Dennison urged festival chairman Sam Cole to make the event an annual one. Parks commission Tommy Thompson agreed, having participated in the event himself, and estimating the island's year-end attendance would have set an all-time record. Boat crews abandoned their schedules, simply going to and from the islands as fast as possible, with the sole off-duty crew called on-duty, and the boats running to midnight, an hour past their normal stop. Chairman Cole agreed the group would try to organize a follow-up event: "We made a few mistakes, wasted a little time and money. But it was worth it. It's been very successful and next time we'll know what pitfalls to avoid. One will be to forget any attempt to raise contributions or assistance from businesses."

The organization began a year-round presence. The Caribana Serenaders performed at the Royal York hotel on Boxing Day, during the Mayor's annual clinic for the Canadian Red Cross Society.

1968

Scheduled to run from July 31 to August 7, the second annual event was to launch with a steel band performance at the Canada Trust Tower, however the local musician union asked them not to play, as they hadn't been informed in advance; Hell's Gate of Antigua did manage to perform at Queen's Park. A grand ball at the Royal York hotel on August 2 picked the king and queen.

Events on the island attracted 25,000 Saturday, 34,000 Sunday, and 31,000 Monday; none of the days beat the one-day record of 38,000, set on July 14. More than 5,000 watched the parade. Reports of the event were limited, merely leading a story about the Simcoe Day weekend, which included notes on attendance at attractions like Fort York and the Tapawingo galleries near Kleinberg. Soon after the event, a letter to the editor complained of the lack of queuing at the Toronto Island ferries; as of 2011, this issue remains for the Toronto Island ferries. The parade ended up losing money.

By year's end, the event would have a challenge. Metro Toronto council approved creation of a week-long Carnival Toronto, aiming to rival Mardi Gras. Chairman John Fisher of the newly formed Friends of the Carnival, Inc. conceived the event as being 2 million people "expressing themselves in an organized week of gaiety, frivolity and fun." The organization would also seek to merge the events of Caribana, the Italian Festival, Canadiana Week, Japanese Tanabata Festival, Mariposa Folk Festival, and a summer music festival, plus all Dominion Day celebrations. He asked for a grant of $20,000, with up to $50,000 later; council indicated this level of support would only be given after a report by Metro's information officer.

1969
A pre-carnival dance was held July 4 at St. Lawrence Market, and a Caribbean-themed art exhibition at the Richview branch of the Etobicoke Library.

The 1969 parade went from Varsity Stadium to the ferry docks. More than 75,000 watched the parade, in which 2000 performed. In the opening weekend, 30,000 visited in the Island. Cost of the festival was estimated to be $45,000, and they hoped to break even. Final stats found 54,000 visited the Island. Johnny Cayonne was a permanent staffer for the Caribana Cultural Committee, (the organization took its name January 15, having incorporated as "Caribbean Committee for Cultural Advancement"). Admission to the Olympia Beach event was reduced from $2 the previous year, to $1.

A variety of events were planned by the group, for the rest of the year. The Caribana Players performed Errol Hill's comedic play "Strictly Matrimony" at the West Indian Federation club on Brunswick Avenue, from Sunday, July 13 to Friday, July 18. The group debuted two new productions at the Colonnade Theatre in November 1969, and another production at Woodbine Inn, the bar of the Constellation Hotel, early the next year. Plans in August were to schedule an event for the winter, "Calysopra". There is no evidence in mainstream newspapers that this event actually ran.

1970

By April, the Caribbean Cultural Committee had moved into new offices at 1079 Bathurst Street, near Dupont Street. The space was opened up for community use, including drama and dance lessons, with the performance practice area clearly visible to the community outside.

St. Lawrence Centre for the Arts hosted a preview of Caribana on July 11, called "Caribana Kiddies Carnival Preview", a free show. The focus on kids' participation was established earlier in the year, with the announcement of a kids area. A Maple Leaf Gardens show on July 31, "Extravaganza '70", included Johnny Nash ("Cupid"), The Mighty Duke, The St. Vincent Police Steel Band, and Haitian master drummer Ti Wowo. Also included were the year's steel band competitions, calypso  competition, King and Queen of the Bands, and a jump up. The show was directed by Bertrand A. Henry. Marianne Skanks, 18, a student at Vaughan Collegiate, won Miss  Caribana '70.

The "Caribana Island Show" went from August 1 to 9. Attendance goals were 100,000; favourable weather brought 25,000 on the opening weekend. Their only funding this year was gate admission. At its end, total attendance had sunk to 45,000 people from 54,000. Similarly, their goal of $80,000 towards a cultural centre was dashed by bills.

The parade from Varsity Stadium to the docks on Bay Street was launched by Eric Gairy, premier of Grenada. Heading from Varsity to Bay Street, at Hayter Street it cut to Yonge Street. Travelling south on Yonge to Front Street, it then proceeded to the docks. "Thousands" lined the streets to watch. Police reported no incidents; "it was very peaceful. The people were just out to have a lot of fun."

The day after the event, Caribbean Cultural Committee director John Cayonne told the Star that festival organizers "who worked at least 15 to 17 hours a day, were not allowed to go onto the ferry ahead of crowds, even though they had identification. There's a strong possibility we won't have Caribana '71 on the island." Metro Parks Commissioner Tommy Thompson expressed doubts that community groups should be charged for using public parks, and whether they in turn should be allowed to charge for events in public parks. Both issues were raised with relation to Caribana's $3,578 debt, that Thompson was asking be forgiven. East York Mayor True Davidson scolded council members for being "petty. This is a group that is doing a good thing both for their ethnic group and for Metro. It's created a real feeling of life and excitement. Let's stop carping and pay it."

1971

Tommy Thompson's requests to Metro Council resulted in a $300-a-day fee be established for use of any of the Toronto Islands, for events like Caribana or the Mariposa Folk Festival, still displaced to Toronto. About a month before the event, the Metro parks committee decided "sipping Sherry... under a maple tree older than Confederation" in a member's backyard that no games of chance could be held on  Toronto Island. Caribana organizers wanted to stage a lottery at the 1971 event, but Commissioner Thompson stated that it might end up encouraging people to visit the island solely in the hopes of winning money, as opposed to recreation.

The fifth time around, Caribana ran July 30 to August 8 on Olympic Island; the event was billed as being the only of its kind in North America. Ferry cruises were scheduled for the week prior, from July 27 to 29, and an "Ole Mas" costume dance was held July 24 at Ontario Science Centre. The event continued until 2 am. Eric Gairy on Grenada returned for the opening night, July 30, now Prime Minister of an independent country, joined by St. Vincent's Prime Minister Milton Cato. The parade route for the year was along from Varsity Stadium, along Bloor to Yonge, down to the ferry docks. Island events ran July 31 to August 8.  Unusually, the parade was confined to just half of Yonge Street. The boat cruises featured the British West Indian Airways' Steltones. Nolan Baynes, 20, won Miss Caribana '71, and was featured on the front page of the Saturday Star.

A 51-year-old, who was watching the Caribana '71 parade with a grandson and neighbour's child, killed two people watching the parade with her car. Trying to turn left on to Yonge Street, the woman's brakes failed, the car hit a pedestrian crossing Front Street, before going through a wrought iron fence along the route, killing two brothers visiting from Washington, D.C., injuring the father of four, and 11 others. The woman was charged with "dangerous driving". A suicide closed the Yonge Street subway line on Friday evening, meaning people leaving Caribana needed to pack limited buses. By the 1:30 am Saturday morning, many became tired of waiting for additional Toronto Transit Commission (TTC) buses, having waited 40 minutes already. They packed onto buses so much "that standing passengers were forced into the laps of those sitting." Several individual fights erupted on the bus, including one "between two men over woman, who claimed one of the men had attacked her." The driver and two off-duty TTC drivers on the bus was not able to bring the passengers to order, so the driver honked his horn for a few minutes straight, until police came.

The year's events were boycotted by the Black Students Union at the University of Toronto, partly because of their feelings that the event had not developed at the speed and in the direction that some would have like. Additionally, they felt that "It is time for black people to understand that we must struggle, not dance, if we are going to survive... the line between reaction and revolution within our community is being indelibly drawn."

The year's festival attracted 45,000 people, cost $60,000, and turned a $5,000 profit. Due to low attendance during the week, the next year's festival would be reduced to just three days, and the total budget increased, partly to open food stalls and get a liquor licence to serve beer.

See also
 Caribbean Carnival
 History of Toronto

References

External links
 
 Jamie Bradburn, "Come Out to Caribana '67", Torontoist, July 27, 2011.
 Some historical material relating to Caribana can be found online from the Toronto Telegram fonds and the Jean Augustine fonds held at the York University Libraries, Clara Thomas Archives & Special Collections

Festivals in Toronto
1960s in Toronto